Padma Nidhi Dhar (21 July 1935 – 11 July 2020) was a three time MLA from Domjur Vidhan Sabha constituency, West Bengal. He was elected to West Bengal State Assembly in 1991, 1996 and 2001 from Communist Party of India (Marxist).

Life and politics 
He was born on 21 July 1935 in Baisari village of Barishal District of undivided Bengal. His family moved to West Bengal when he was in the ninth grade at Baisari High School and  lived in a rented house in Tiffin Bazaar area.  He completed his schooling from Bally Jora Ashwathtala School and did his graduation from Surendranath College of Kolkata. Later he pursued master's degrees in Bengali and History as a private student. He worked as a rail hocker. He died on 11 July 2020. He is the grandfather of SFI All India Joint Secretary, Dipsita Dhar.

Padma Nidhi Dhar was first jailed on 1956 for a month during the political movement against Bengal Bihar unification.  Then in 1966 again he was arrested and jailed for a year in PD act, as he was active in the food movement. He was elected to the Howrah district committee of CPI in 1960. Later he became CPI(M) Howrah district secretariat member.

After his death, Padma Nidhi Dhar memorial trust was formed, where they take up different social, welfare and cultural activities, including blood donation camp, examination workshops etc.

References 

1936 births
West Bengal MLAs 1991–1996
West Bengal MLAs 1996–2001
Communist Party of India (Marxist) politicians
2020 deaths
People from Barisal District
People from Howrah district